Derek Christopher Bellotti (born 25 December 1946) is an English retired professional footballer who played as a goalkeeper.

Career 

Derek Bellotti began his career as an apprentice with Queens Park Rangers in September 1963. He turned professional and spent two seasons on loan to Bedford Town before being released at end of the 1965–66 season without making his debut for QPR.

He joined Gillingham in July 1966 and went on to make 35 league appearances for the Gills. In October 1970 he joined Southend United on loan, playing 3 games and later that month was transferred to Charlton Athletic for a fee of £5,000. He played 14 league games for Charlton before moving to Southend United again in December 1971, this time on a permanent basis. He was Southend's regular 'keeper, staying at Roots Hall until May 1974 when he joined Swansea City after playing 74 league games for Southend.
 
He only stayed at the Vetch Field for one season, playing 19 times in the league, before moving back into non-league football with Maidstone United, spending two months on loan at Margate from January 1978. Later that year, his career outside football took him to live in Abbotskerswell, Devon and he signed for Cornish non-league side St Blazey from where he signed for Torquay United in October 1979 as cover for John Turner and later for Vince O'Keefe. When Torquay scrapped their reserve team in 1982, he left without making a league appearance, joining Falmouth Town. He subsequently played for Bideford, Saltash United, Newquay, and Torrington.

In December 1997, at the age of 50, he played for Ilfracombe Town as a temporary replacement for regular 'Combe goalkeeper, his son Ross, who was also a professional with Exeter City.

Bellotti is currently managing director of Kingfisher Print and Design, a print firm based in Dartington.

References

External links
Swanseacity 
Thirty years ago

1946 births
Living people
Footballers from East Ham
English footballers
Gillingham F.C. players
Bedford Town F.C. players
Southend United F.C. players
Charlton Athletic F.C. players
English people of Italian descent
Swansea City A.F.C. players
Torquay United F.C. players
Maidstone United F.C. players
Margate F.C. players
St Blazey A.F.C. players
Ilfracombe Town F.C. players
Newquay A.F.C. players
Torrington F.C. players
Bideford A.F.C. players
Falmouth Town A.F.C. players
Saltash United F.C. players
Association football goalkeepers